Nzagi (Andrada) is a town, with a population of 60,000 (2014), and a municipality in Lunda Norte Province in Angola.

Nzagi (Andrada) is served by Nzagi Airport, a small airport located 3 kilometers southwards.

References

Populated places in Lunda Norte Province
Municipalities of Angola